Estiar (also Romanized as Estīār, Asteyār, and Astīār; also known as Estiaré Mehranrood and Istiar) is a village in Meydan Chay Rural District, in the Central District of Tabriz County, East Azerbaijan Province, Iran. At the 2006 census, its population was 508, in 89 families.

References 

Populated places in Tabriz County